Ricki & Copper (1959–1969) was a popular local children's program that ran weekday mornings on WTAE-TV in Pittsburgh, Pennsylvania, and was one of two locally produced children's shows that aired on WTAE, the other being Paul Shannon's Adventure Time, which aired in the afternoon. The show was originally an offshoot of another local program, The Comedy Show which ran from 1958 to 1959.

Background
The series was hosted by Ricki Wertz and "Copper", a half whippet, half golden retriever with reddish hair, who in real life was owned by Wertz. The live program featured children in the audience and like most children shows back in the day featured fun, games, safety tips and cartoons. She would also reward her audience with Hostess cupcakes after chanting "Ala-ka-zaam, Ka-zaam, Ka-zoom!" during every show. 

Other characters on the program included a puppet called Mr. Boom-Man (who was attached to a boom microphone), which was created by Wertz's husband, Tom Borden. Mr. Boom-Man was intended to help Wertz keep the mostly four to eight year olds focused on the camera and not on Copper, who viewers believed was the actual star of the show. 

In addition to the morning show, Wertz hosted a midday edition, Ricki & Magoo, a 15-minute program where she introduced Mr. Magoo cartoons after WTAE's noon newscast.

Final years
However, tragedy would strike the show in 1967, when a stroke resulted in Copper becoming paralyzed and would be euthanized that same year. Another dog, (full-blooded golden retriever with reddish hair)  Copper Penny, would become the new "Copper."

But by 1969, Wertz decided to no longer do "Ricki & Copper" due to her decision to become a full-time mother after her daughter was born (prematurely). Wertz however continued to host another WTAE program, Junior High Quiz, until it ended its run in 1982.

Nostalgia
Even though the episodes have thought to be bulked-erased, Pittsburghers today still remember the series as photos and archives of the program can be found on several websites including WTAE's homepage. In December 2014, a rare full-length episode of the program that WTAE had taped was posted on the station's website.

Video Clips
Part 1
Part 2
Part 3
Part 4

See also
List of local children's television series

External links
"Ricki Wertz's career focused on kids" (from Tribune-Review in 2003)
Article from In Pittsburgh Newsweekly from 1998
Show detailed on WTAE's website
Pictures of Wertz at Pittsburgh's Familiar Faces
Article from 1996 mentions Ricki & Copper
Wertz photo

Mass media in Pittsburgh
Local children's television programming in the United States
1959 American television series debuts
1969 American television series endings
1950s American children's television series
1960s American children's television series
American television shows featuring puppetry
Television shows set in Pittsburgh